Washington County is the name of 30 counties and one parish in the United States of America, all named after George Washington, revolutionary war general and first President of the United States. It is the most common county name in the United States. The following 32 states and one district have or had a Washington County:

Extant counties

Washington County, Alabama
Washington County, Arkansas
Washington County, Colorado
Washington County, Florida
Washington County, Georgia
Washington County, Idaho
Washington County, Illinois
Washington County, Indiana
Washington County, Iowa
Washington County, Kansas
Washington County, Kentucky
Washington Parish, Louisiana
Washington County, Maine (in Massachusetts prior to 1820)
Washington County, Maryland
Washington County, Minnesota
Washington County, Mississippi

Washington County, Missouri
Washington County, Nebraska
Washington County, New York
Washington County, North Carolina
Washington County, Ohio
Washington County, Oklahoma
Washington County, Oregon
Washington County, Pennsylvania
Washington County, Rhode Island
Washington County, Tennessee
Washington County, Texas
Washington County, Utah
Washington County, Vermont
Washington County, Virginia
Washington County, Wisconsin

Former counties
Washington County, South Dakota, a former county (1883–1943) that was divided in 1943 because of financial troubles in South Dakota
Washington County, District of Columbia, a former county of the District of Columbia that was abolished in 1871 along with all of the other counties in that District
Washington County, Massachusetts, became Washington County, Maine, in 1820 when Maine was separated and granted statehood status.
Washington District, North Carolina, a district and later county in North Carolina that became part of Tennessee in 1796.

Other uses
List of Washington counties, counties in the state of Washington
Washington County (album), a 1970 album by Arlo Guthrie
Washington County School District (disambiguation)

See also
 List of places named for George Washington
 
 County (disambiguation)
 Washington (disambiguation)